Lamy is a surname. Notable people with the surname include:

A–C
Alexandra Lamy (born 1971), French actress
Alfred Lamy (1886–1922), French archetier (maker of bows for musical string instruments)
Amédée-François Lamy (1858–1900), French military officer
Benoît Lamy (1945–2008), Belgian motion picture writer and director
Bernard Lamy (1640–1715), French theologian and mathematician
Brigitte Lamy (born 1950), French curler
Charles Lamy (1857–1940), French actor
Charles Lamy (New York politician) (1849–?), U.S. merchant and politician
C. Josef Lamy ( 1930s–?), German pen manufacturer, founder of Lamy
Claude-Auguste Lamy (1820–1878), French chemist

D–I
Étienne Lamy (1845–1919), French political writer

François Lamy (politician) (born 1959), French politician
François Lamy (theologian) (1636–1711), French Benedictine ascetical and apologetic writer
Gérard Lamy (born 1919), Québécois-Canadian politician
Guillaume Lamy (1644–1683), French physician and Epicurean materialist
Hippolyte Camille Lamy (1875–1942), French archetier (maker of bows for musical string instruments)
Ingmari Lamy (born 1947), Swedish fashion model

J–O
James Lamy (1928–1992) U.S. bobsledder and Olympic competitor
Jason Lamy-Chappuis (born 1986), Franco-American Olympic skier
Jean-Baptiste Lamy (1814–1888), French Roman Catholic archbishop
Jean-Claude Lamy (born 1941), French writer and journalist
Jenny Lamy (born 1949), Australian Olympic sprinter
Jerome Lamy (1726–1781), Austrian Benedictine Biblical scholar, writer and educator
Joseph Alfred Lamy (Lamy Père; 1850–1919), French archetier (maker of bows for musical string instruments)
Lamy Père (see: Joseph Alfred Lamy, above)

P–Z
Pascal Lamy (born 1947), French politician and World Trade Organization Director-General
Pedro Lamy (born 1972), Portuguese automobile racer
Peronet Lamy (died before July 1453), Gothic painter and manuscript illuminator

Pierre-Henri Lamy (born 1987), French footballer
Pierre Marie Édouard Lamy de la Chapelle (1804–1886), French botanist

Steven Lamy, U.S. international relations professor
Thomas Joseph Lamy (1827–1927), Belgian Biblical scholar and Orientalist
Vincent Lamy (born 1999), Canadian soccer player

Surnames from nicknames